The Donald L. Tucker Civic Center is a multi-purpose indoor arena located on the Florida State University campus in Tallahassee, Florida, United States. The arena has the biggest capacity of any arena in the Florida Panhandle. The arena opened in 1981 and was built at a cost of over $30 million, financed by the city. In 2013, the venue was purchased by the Florida State University Board of Trustees. The facility is located on the southeastern side of the university's campus, between the FSU College of Law and the future home of the FSU College of Business.

The arena is also located on the "Madison Mile", an economic development that connects the venue and Doak Campbell Stadium.

About the arena
The arena is home to the Florida State Seminoles men's basketball and Florida State Seminoles women's basketball teams.  Covering , this versatile Arena can accommodate 1,000 people for banquets and receptions for up to 2,000. The arena has upholstered seats for sporting events, concerts, touring Broadway productions and family shows. The arena can increase the capacity with risers. Risers are usually added on to the side of the arena wall blending in perfectly with the permanent seats. Risers are usually only given out to the events of wrestling, basketball and sometimes, concerts. The arena can be configured in a variety of seating arrangements for each type of event.

As a concert venue, the arena can seat between 2,372 and 12,041.  As a convention center, it can accommodate 18,900 square feet (1760 m²) in the main arena plus 35,000 square feet (3300 m²) at the adjoining exhibit hall, in addition to 16,000 square feet (1500 m²) of space at the meeting rooms.  Concerts, sporting events, trade shows, Broadway shows, conventions, ice shows, circuses, and other events are held here annually.

The Centre Theater is a 6,000-seat theater configuration used for small concerts, preaching and other theater type events. The theater provides not only a traditional counterweight system for shows accustomed to a conventional theatre venue, but also a perfect setting for musical artists that prefer a more intimate performance space. It is equipped with a state-of-the-art sound system capable of providing reinforcement for upper level and club seat fill, as well as motorized clusters that may be utilized for additional support. The Centre Theater has been proud to host the Tallahassee Broadway Series for the last 11 years and has presented such tours as Les Misérables, Riverdance, Cats, Beauty and the Beast, Chicago, Fosse and Rent. In addition, numerous musical artists have chosen to perform in this configuration.

Renovations
Prior to the summer of 2014, much of the existing infrastructure and equipment in use had been there since the arena opened in 1981. This included some equipment that was so outdated that it couldn't be replaced. Further deferred maintenance occurred while the arena was owned by Leon County and the City of Tallahassee.

FSU gave the arena a major renovation during the summer of 2014. The arena received new seats, Jumbotrons including new LED ribbon boards, and a new floor, all at the cost of $10 million. Before then, the only renovation occurred in 1998, when the facility's roof was replaced.

History

The arena was named the Donald L. Tucker Civic Center in 1977 in honor of Donald L. Tucker, Esq., a former Speaker of the Florida House of Representatives and Special Ambassador for the United States to the Dominican Republic. Upon opening, the venue was named the Tallahassee-Leon County Civic Center. In 2001, the Florida Senate proposed reverting the civic center to its original name; however, this provision was vetoed. The center reverted to its original name in January 2012. The venue was owned by the Tallahassee Leon County Civic Center Authority until 2012.

The Civic Center has been the home to many sports teams. It has had WCW Thunder, WWF SmackDown! and WWE Live Events, including men's and women's basketball tournaments. It is also home to the Florida State Seminoles men's and women's basketball teams.  Before they moved, it was also host to the Tallahassee Tiger Sharks ice hockey team of the ECHL.  Other professional teams that called the center home included the Tallahassee Thunder of AF2 and the Tallahassee Scorpions soccer team of the EISL.  In 2007 it was home to the Tallahassee Titans of the American Indoor Football Association.  The team then left the AIFL for the World Indoor Football League but then folded after the owner failed to acquire enough capital to finance the team.  The WIFL then folded as other members jumped to other leagues. The Tallahassee Tigers were a planned ABA team that could not find a home in the arena due to the Seminoles' basketball season conflicting with the Tigers' schedule. As a result, the team never made their anticipated 2007 debut in the ABA.

Notable shows
 October 11, 1981: The Kinks - Give the People What They Want Tour
 October 29, 1981: The Beach Boys
 April 9, 1982: Rush - Signals Tour
 June 9, 1982: Iron Maiden - The Beast on the Road tour
 October 31, 1983: The Police - Synchronicity Tour
 April 3, 1985: Prince - Purple Rain Tour
 November 7, 1985: Tina Turner - Private Dancer Tour, supported by Mr. Mister
 October 10, 1988: AC/DC - Blow Up Your Video Tour
 May 10, 1990: Aerosmith - Pump Tour
 December 9, 1991: Van Halen - For Unlawful Carnal Knowledge Tour
 February 4, 1993: Metallica - Wherever We May Roam Tour
 December 2, 1993: Nirvana - In Utero Tour
 April 9, 1994: Smashing Pumpkins - Siamese Dream Tour
 October 19, 1996: Toni Braxton – Secrets Tour
 October 29, 1996: Phish
 August 13, 1999: The Moody Blues - Strange Times
 December 16, 1999: WWE Smackdown
 April 1, 2004: Aerosmith - Honkin on Bobo Tour
 June 10, 2007: T-Pain - Epiphany Tour
 February 10, 2008: Larry the Cable Guy
 February 29, 2008: Keith Urban/Carrie Underwood - Love, Pain and the Whole Crazy Carnival Ride Tour
 March 23, 2008: Elton John
 November 8, 2008: Trans-Siberian Orchestra
 December 2, 2008: Avenged Sevenfold/Shinedown - Avenged Sevenfold Tour
 January 16, 2009: TobyMac - Portable Sounds Tour
 January 27, 2009: 3 Doors Down
 May 4, 2010: Carrie Underwood - Play On Tour
 February 24, 2012: Drake - Club Paradise Tour 
 February 28, 2012: Jimmy Buffett - Lounging at the Lagoon Tour
 March 9, 2012: Trans-Siberian Orchestra - Beethoven's Last Night Tour
 March 24, 2012: Eric Church - The Blood, Sweat & Beers Tour 
 May 17, 2012: Miranda Lambert - On Fire Tour
 October 19, 2012: T.I. - War Chant (FSU Homecoming)
 February 21, 2013: Zac Brown Band 
 February 24, 2013: Jeff Dunham - Disorderly Conduct Tour
 September 5, 2013: Jason Aldean - Night Train Tour
 January 24, 2014: Brad Paisley - Beat This Winter Tour
 October 24, 2014: Jake Owen - Days of Gold Tour
 April 21, 2014: Wiz Khalifa
 April 25, 2014: Darius Rucker
 September 9, 2014: Fitz and the Tantrums
 March 26, 2015: Eric Church - The Outsiders Tour
 May 7, 2015: Riot Games - The first League of Legends Mid-Season Invitational
 November 12, 2015: Zac Brown Band - Jekyll and Hyde Tour
 October 28, 2016: Lil Wayne/Rich Homie Quan
 January 27, 2017: Florida Georgia Line - Dig Your Roots Tour
 February 19, 2017: TobyMac, Matt Maher, Mandisa, Mac Powell, Capital Kings, Ryan Stevenson, Hollyn - Hits Deep Live

See also
Florida State Seminoles
List of convention centers in the United States
List of NCAA Division I basketball arenas

References

External links
 Official website

Convention centers in Florida
College basketball venues in the United States
Indoor ice hockey venues in the United States
Florida State Seminoles basketball venues
Music venues in Florida
Soccer venues in Florida
Sports venues in Tallahassee, Florida
Event venues established in 1981
1981 establishments in Florida
Sports venues completed in 1981
Indoor arenas in Florida